Olha Yuryivna Polyuk (born September 15, 1987, in Khmelnytskyi) is a Ukrainian freestyle skier, specializing in aerials. She competed at the 2010, 2014 and 2018 Winter Olympics.

Career
Polyuk started her international career on February 11, 2006, when she debuted at the European Cup and finished 4th in Minsk. The next day, she achieved the podium at the European Cup in Minsk, finishing 2nd. She competed at two Junior World Championships (in 2006 and 2007), winning bronze medals at both of them.

Polyuk made her World Cup debut on February 25, 2007, in Apex, Canada, where she finished 13th. Her first World Cup podium came during the 2021–22 season on December 10, 2021, in Ruka, Finland. It was also the first World Cup event when two Ukrainian female athletes finished in Top-3 (Anastasiya Novosad was the winner).

She competed at eight World Championships. As of January 2022, her best World Championships result was 7th in 2019.

Polyuk competed at the 2010 Winter Olympics for Ukraine. She placed 20th in the qualifying round of the aerials, failing to advance to the final.

Then she also competed at the 2014 Winter Olympics for Ukraine. She placed 15th in the qualifying round of the aerials, failing to advance to the final again.

Polyuk was the only Ukrainian in the women's aerials event at the 2018 Winter Olympics. She finished 16th.

In 2022, Olha Polyuk was nominated for her fourth Winter Games in Beijing.

Career results

Winter Olympics

World Championships

World Cup

Individual podiums

Individual rankings

European Cup

Individual podiums

Team podiums

Nor-Am Cup

Individual podiums

References

External links

1987 births
Living people
Olympic freestyle skiers of Ukraine
Freestyle skiers at the 2010 Winter Olympics
Freestyle skiers at the 2014 Winter Olympics
Freestyle skiers at the 2018 Winter Olympics
Freestyle skiers at the 2022 Winter Olympics
Sportspeople from Khmelnytskyi, Ukraine
Ukrainian female freestyle skiers